Richard James Nixon (29 October 1965 –  31 January 1992) was an Australian rules footballer who played with Richmond in the Victorian/Australian Football League (VFL/AFL).

After playing his early football with Oakleigh in the VFA, Nixon came to Richmond where he would be used as a ruckman and utility. He spent four seasons with Richmond and after initially struggling to get games put together 13 appearances in both 1989 and 1990 under coach Kevin Bartlett.

He was captain-coach of the Warrnambool Football Club in 1991.

Nixon died on 31 January 1992, from injuries sustained in a road accident. He was one of seven occupants on a van which collided with a truck, near Millicent in South Australia, on their way to work on an oil rig.

References

External links

Richard Nixon's playing statistics from The VFA Project

1965 births
1992 deaths
VFL/AFL players born outside Australia
Oakleigh Football Club players
Richmond Football Club players
Warrnambool Football Club players
Warrnambool Football Club coaches
Australian rules footballers from Victoria (Australia)
Road incident deaths in South Australia
People from Millicent, South Australia